Anton Tokarev (born November 22, 1984  in Novosibirsk, Russia, Soviet Union) is a Russian pair skater. With partner Valeria Simakova, he won the 2005 Junior Grand Prix Final. He previously competed with Ekaterina Gladkova.

External links

Navigation

Russian male pair skaters
1984 births
Living people
Sportspeople from Novosibirsk